Jaridih Bazar is a census town in the Bermo CD block in the Bermo subdivision of the Bokaro district in the Jharkhand state, India.

Geography

Location

It is on the banks of Damodar River, a little above its point of confluence with Konar River.

Area overview
Bokaro district consists of undulating uplands on the Chota Nagpur Plateau with the Damodar River cutting a valley right across. The East Bokaro Coalfield located in the Bermo-Phusro area and small intrusions of Jharia Coalfield make Bokaro a coal rich district. In 1965, one of the largest steel manufacturing units in the country, Bokaro Steel Plant, operated by Steel Authority of India Limited, was set-up at Bokaro Steel City. The Damodar Valley Corporation established its first thermal power station at Bokaro (Thermal). The soil is generally infertile and agriculture is mostly rain-fed.

Note: The map alongside presents some of the notable locations in the district. All places marked in the map are linked in the larger full screen map.

Demographics
According to the 2011 Census of India, Jaridih Bazar had a total population of 31,882, of which 16,642 (52%) were males and 15,242 (48%) were females. Population in the age range 0-6 years was 4,025. The total number of literate persons in Jaridih Bazar was 22,007 (79.00% of the population over 6 years).

According to the 2011 Census of India, Phusro Urban Agglomeration had a total population of 186,139, of which males were 97,665 and females 88,874. Phusro Urban Agglomeration is composed of Phusro (NP), Bermo (CT), Jaridih Bazar (CT), Bokaro (CT) and Kurpania (CT).

 India census, Jaridih Bazar had a population of 30,091. Males constitute 54% of the population and females 46%. Jaridih Bazar has an average literacy rate of 64%, higher than the national average of 59.5%: male literacy is 73%, and female literacy is 53%. In Jaridih Bazar, 14% of the population is under 6 years of age.

Infrastructure
According to the District Census Handbook 2011, Bokaro, Jaridih Bazar  covered an area of 11.30 km2. Among the civic amenities, it had 31 km roads with open drains, the protected water supply involved tap water from treated and untreated sources, overhead tank. It had 5,676 domestic electric connections, 300 road lighting points. Among the medical facilities, it had 4 hospitals, 2 dispensaries, 2 health centres, 1 family welfare centre, 4 maternity and child welfare centres, 1 maternity home, 1 nursing home, 9  medicine shops. Among the educational facilities it had 11 primary schools, 9 middle schools, 6 secondary schools, the nearest senior secondary school at Bermo 6 km away, 1  general degree college. It had 5 non-formal educational centres (Sarva Siksha Abhiyan). Among the social, recreational and cultural facilities it had 36 auditorium/ community halls, 1 public library, 1 reading room. Two important commodities it produced were coal and furniture. It had the branch office of 3 nationalised banks, 1 cooperative bank, 2 non-agricultural credit societies.

References

Cities and towns in Bokaro district